Vinsten is a Swedish electropop duo made up of Calle Wachtmeister and Niklas Benjaminson. Their debut single "Luckiest Girl", a theme song from Portkod 1321, a 10-part web series on Swedish website SVT Play in October and November 2012 has made it to #15 on Sverigetopplistan, the official Swedish Singles Chart.

Discography

References

External links
Official website

Swedish musical duos
English-language singers from Sweden